Salaiya is a town in sidhi district , Madhya Pradesh, India.

References

Cities and towns in Katni district
Katni